Bengaluru City University (BCU), formerly Bengaluru Central University, is a state university located in Bengaluru, Karnataka. It was formed in 2017 and renamed in 2020.

History 
The university was formed in 2017 following the trifurcation of Bangalore University, Dr. Venugopal K R, UVCE Alumni, Principal UVCE was the Special Officer   to the Government of Karnataka for Trifurcating Bangalore University. He submitted the report on 26th March 2015 for restructuring Bangalore University into Bangalore University, Bengaluru City University and Bengaluru North University and renamed in 2020. The first vice chancellor (VC) of the university was S. Japhet. Narasimha Murthy replaced him as an interim VC in November 2020 until the appointment of Lingaraja Gandhi in April 2021.

Affiliation 
For the academic year 2019-20 the university had 204 affiliated colleges, 24 education colleges, and 9 autonomous colleges. Notable affiliated colleges include:

 College of Fine Arts, Bangalore
 Government Science College, Bangalore
 Jyoti Nivas College
 Maharani Lakshmi Ammani Women's College
 Mount Carmel College, Bangalore
 Vijaya College, Bangalore

References

External links 
 

2017 establishments in Karnataka
Universities and colleges in Bangalore
Educational institutions established in 2017